Farmington High School (FHS) is a public high school in Farmington, New Mexico (USA). It is part of the Farmington Municipal School District.

FHS is one of two high schools in Farmington. It serves students in grades 9 through 12 who reside on the west side of the city along NM 170 and NM 371. The second high school in Farmington is Piedra Vista High School, which is located on the east side of the city.

Athletics 

State Championships

Notable alumni 
 Bob Breitenstein – former offensive lineman. First Argentine player in the NFL
 Ralph Neely – Dallas Cowboys, NFL 1960s All-Decade Team.
 Duane Ward – Toronto Blue Jays, 2 time World Series Champion, MLB all-star, MLB saves champion.
 Joey Villasenor – professional mixed martial artist

References

External links

 Farmington Municipal Schools

Public high schools in New Mexico
Schools in San Juan County, New Mexico